Desiré (also Désiré, Lai del Desire) is an Old French Breton lai, named after its protagonist. It is one of the so-called Anonymous Lais. It is 'a fairy-mistress story set in Scotland'. Translated into Old Norse, the poem also became part of the Strengleikar, and the translation is relevant to establishing the archetype of the French text.

Manuscripts

P. Cologny-Gevève, Bibliotheca Bodmeriana, Phillips 3713, f. 7v, col. 2--12v. col. 1. Anglo-Norman, thirteenth-century.
S. Paris, Bibliothèque Nationale, nouv. acq. fr. 1104, f. 10v, col. 1--15v, col. 1. Francien, c. 1300.
N. Uppsala, De la Gardie, 4-7, pp. 37–48.

Editions

 Margaret E. Grimes, The Lays of Desiré, Graelent and Melion: Edition of the Texts with an Introduction (New York: Institute of French Studies, 1928).
 Alexandre Micha, Lais féeriques des XIIe et XIIIe siècles (Paris: GF-Flammarion, 1992)

References

Lais (poetic form)